Dr. Panchanan Mitra (25 May 1892 – 25 July 1936) was the professor of anthropology in India succeeded by Sarat Chandra Mitra(1863-1938) and B.S.Guha(1894-1961).  He was among the first Indians to study at Yale University and conducted several anthropological expeditions in India and abroad. He was the head of the Department of Anthropology of the University of Calcutta and is most known for his works Prehistoric India (1923), History of Ameri-can Anthropology (1930) and Indo-Poly-nesian Memories (1933). He was awarded the Fellowship of the Royal Anthropological Institute of Great Britain and Ireland and today the Asiatic Society awards an annual ‘Panchanan Mitra Memorial Lectureship’ for outstanding contributions to anthropology.

Personal life and family
He was born to a well-known Kayastha family at Soora, an eastern suburb of Kolkata, India on 24 May 1892. The Mitra family was one of the oldest families of Bengal and received various honours from the Bengal Nawab. Raja Pitambar Mitra migrated to Oudh after the disaster at Palashi, and the family was settled there for many generations. When the family was under Ajodhyaram they received many honors from the Nawab Vizir of Oudh and the emperor at Delhi as well. Many members of the Mitra family were well known in literary circles. Pitambar and his grandson, Janmejay Mitra wrote Brajabuli poems. Janmejay was an Urdu poet of distinguished standing as well. Dr. Mitra's 1892. His grandfather’s
elder brother was Rajendralal Mitra was the first Indian President of The Asiatic Society and one of the pioneers of the Indian Renaissance. Rajendralal was the third son of Janmejay Mitra. Mitra died on 25 July 1936.

Career
He was the first Professor of Anthropology at the University of Calcutta, and received the "Bishop Museum Fellowship" in 1924 for studying "Polynesian affinities with India". Panchanan Mitra was the first Indian to obtain  a PhD from Yale University, USA in the year 1930. At Yale, he worked under the supervision of Clark Wissler. Mitra undertook and supervised several pioneering anthropological expeditions in India and abroad. Several of his students became notable. Nirmal Kumar Bose,  personal secretary of Mahatma Gandhi during the Noakhali pre-partition riots was his student.

Awards and memberships
He was awarded several medals and fellowships during his lifetime and was a member of several professional bodies. He was awarded the Fellowship of the Royal Anthropological Institute of Great Britain and Ireland. He was appointed as the Assistant Curator of the Archaeology section of the Indian Museum. He was the Honorary Magistrate of Kolkata from 1922 to 1924 and later served as a councillor in the Municipal corporation of the city till 1927. He presided over the Anthropology proceedings in the Indian Science Congress in 1933 and the anthropogenetics sessions of the Indian Population Congress, Lucknow in 1936. He was also an associate member at the American Museum of Natural History. The Asiatic Society awards an annual ‘Panchanan Mitra Memorial Lectureship’  for outstanding contributions to the field of anthropology in his name.

Legacy
The recent (2005) publication of his book entitled Manual of Prehistoric India shows the continuing importance of his work. Although his contributions included much outside the realm of anthropology, probably his greatest legacy is the introduction and development of anthropology as an academic discipline in India. Presently, anthropology and its related sub-disciplines are taught in more than 40 Indian universities.

Bibliography
 1923 A History of American Anthropology, University of Calcutta. 1933(PDF)
 1927 Prehistoric India: Its place in the World's Cultures
 1933 Indo-Polynesian Memories
 A Manual of Prehistoric India

See also
 Rajendralal Mitra
 Biraja Sankar Guha

References

External links
 Books by Panchanan Mitra on openlibrary.org
Kenneth A. R. Kennedy on Dr. Panchanan Mitra in his book God-apes and Fossil Men

Indian anthropologists
1892 births
1936 deaths
Scientists from Kolkata
Yale University alumni
Academic staff of the University of Calcutta
Anthropology educators
20th-century Indian educational theorists
Indian social sciences writers
20th-century Indian non-fiction writers
Writers from Kolkata
20th-century anthropologists
Expatriates from British India in the United States